Hill Top is an unincorporated community in Fleming County, Kentucky, United States.

Notable residents
Franklin Sousley, one of the men shown in the famous Joe Rosenthal Associated Press photograph of US Marines and Sailors raising the second US flag on Iwo Jima, was born in Hill Top on 19 September 1925. He was killed in action on Iwo Jima after having been shot by a Japanese sniper on 21 March 1945, about a month after the famous photograph was captured. He was only 19 years of age. His body was first interred on Iwo Jima, but was later returned home for his final interment on May 8, 1947, in Elizaville Cemetery.

References

Unincorporated communities in Fleming County, Kentucky
Unincorporated communities in Kentucky